The 1999 Paris Open  was a men's tennis tournament played on indoor carpet courts. It was the 27th edition of the Paris Masters, and is part of the ATP Super 9 of the 1999 ATP Tour. It took place at the Palais omnisports de Paris-Bercy in Paris, France, from 1 November through 8 November 1999. First-seeded Andre Agassi won the singles title.

Finals

Singles

 Andre Agassi defeated  Marat Safin 7–6(7–1), 6–2, 4–6, 6–4
It was Andre Agassi's 5th title of the year and his 44th overall. It was his 1st Masters Series title of the year, and his 10th overall.

Doubles

 Sébastien Lareau /  Alex O'Brien defeated  Paul Haarhuis /  Jared Palmer 7–6(9–7), 7–5

References

External links
 Official website
 ATP tournament profile